The Dead is the name of two poems by Rupert Brooke, parts III and IV of his collection 1914.

1914 
Brooke wrote the five poems that were published in 1914 in the autumn after the outbreak of the First World War when he enlisted in the Royal Naval Division. Also in this collection is 'The Soldier', one of Brooke's most famous poems, though 'The Dead' (IV) was one of his personal favourites. The poems were published in New Numbers before being published in 1914. Brooke published five poems for this collection: I: 'Peace', II: 'Safety', III: 'The Dead', IV: 'The Dead', V: 'The Soldier'.

III: The Dead

Blow out, you bugles, over the rich Dead!
There's none of these so lonely and poor of old,
But, dying, has made us rarer gifts than gold.
These laid the world away; poured out the red
Sweet wine of youth; gave up the years to be
Of work and joy, and that unhoped serene,
That men call age; and those who would have been.
Their sons, they gave, their immortality.

Blow, bugles, blow! They brought us, for our dearth.
Holiness, lacked so long, and Love, and Pain.
Honour has come back, as a king, to earth,
And paid his subjects with a royal wage;
And Nobleness walks in our ways again;
And we have come into our heritage.

IV: The Dead

These hearts were woven of human joys and cares,
Washed marvellously with sorrow, swift to mirth.
The years had given them kindness. Dawn was theirs,
And sunset, and the colours of the earth.
These had seen movement, and heard music; known
Slumber and waking; loved; gone proudly friended;
Felt the quick stir of wonder; sat alone;
Touched flowers and furs and cheeks. All this is ended.

There are waters blown by changing winds to laughter
And lit by the rich skies, all day. And after,
Frost, with a gesture, stays the waves that dance
And wandering loveliness. He leaves a white
Unbroken glory, a gathered radiance,
A width, a shining peace, under the night.

Usage

The first three lines of the third poem appear engraved on the Memorial arch located at the entrance to the Royal Military College of Canada which commemorated the fallen ex-cadets from World War I onwards. The first eight lines of the third poem appear on Royal Naval Division War Memorial.

External links

 

World War I poems
1914 poems
Poems about death